Stoyan Stefanov (born 28 July 1983) is a Bulgarian former footballer who played as a midfielder.

References

External links
 

Living people
1983 births
Bulgarian footballers
PFC Kaliakra Kavarna players
OFC Sliven 2000 players
PFC Minyor Pernik players
First Professional Football League (Bulgaria) players
Association football midfielders
Sportspeople from Sliven